Pasym is a small town in Szczytno County, Warmian-Masurian Voivodeship, Poland, with a total population (as of 30 June 2016) of 2,556. It is located in Masuria.

History

A small settlement named Heinrichswalde was first mentioned in 1381. In 1386 this settlement was renamed Passenheim after the Teutonic Knight Heinrich Walpot von Passenheim from modern Bassenheim near Koblenz.

In 1441 the town joined the Prussian Confederation, at which request in 1454 King Casimir IV Jagiellon signed the act of incorporation of the region to the Kingdom of Poland, recognized the Polish king as rightful ruler and remained within Poland throughout the entire Thirteen Years’ War. After the peace treaty signed in Toruń in 1466, the town became a part of Poland as a fief held by the State of the Teutonic Order until 1525, and by the secular Duchy of Prussia afterwards, remaining a Polish fief until 1657.

The town was destroyed by the Tatar raids in 1656, which has been described by Christoph Hartknoch (1644–1687). In the late 17th century Poles formed the majority of its population.

In 1701 the town became part of the Kingdom of Prussia and subsequently, in 1871, it became part of Germany. In 1773 it was included in the newly established province of East Prussia. During the Napoleonic Wars, French troops stayed in the town in 1807 and 1812. In 1883, Poles formed the majority of the local Lutheran parish (majority of the town's population was Lutheran), with 5,095 people in comparison to 1,015 Germans.

In the East Prussian plebiscite of 1920 1,459 inhabitants voted to remain in Germany, 40 to join reborn Poland. After World War II the region became again part of Poland by the Potsdam Agreement. Most Germans fled or were expelled in accordance with the Potsdam Agreement. The remaining Polish population was joined by Polish settlers, many of whom were expelled from the former eastern Polish territories annexed by the Soviet Union. In 1947, an orphanage for war orphans was established in Pasym, which today continues to operate as an ordinary orphanage.

Transport
The Polish National road 53 runs through the town, and there is also a train station.

Sports
The local football club is Błękitni Pasym. It competes in the lower leagues.

Notable residents
 Johann Wilhelm Ebel (1784–1861), Lutheran clergyman and teacher
 Marie-Luise Gothein (1863–1931), scholar, gardener and author
 Christoph Hartknoch (1644-1687), teacher, historian, author
 Friedrich-Wilhelm Morzik (1891-1985), Luftwaffe general

International relations

Twin towns — sister cities
Pasym is twinned with:
  Bassenheim, Germany

Gallery

References

Cities and towns in Warmian-Masurian Voivodeship
Szczytno County